This is a list of pay-per-view (PPV) events held by the American professional wrestling promotion Impact Wrestling.

From its inception, Impact Wrestling's main output was a two-hour weekly program broadcast exclusively on pay-per-view. Their first event was held on June 19, 2002 in Huntsville, Alabama; the last of these shows aired on September 8, 2004. Soon after the launch of its flagship, weekly television program, Impact!, on June 4, 2004, the promotion began producing monthly, live, three-hour pay-per-view events; the first of these events, Victory Road aired on November 7, 2004. These events were initially held at the Impact Zone in Orlando, Florida.

In January 2013, Impact's monthly event schedule was revamped to focus on four, quarterly-held, PPV cards (later reduced to two events per year, from 2015 to 2017). In place of monthly events, Impact began producing the TNA One Night Only series of taped specials that aired via pay-per-view providers. These in-turn would be succeeded from 2019 onwards by the Impact Plus Monthly Specials, which are directly tied to storylines leading into the promotion's PPV events.

Weekly pay-per-view events (2002–2004)

NWA: Total Nonstop Action (NWA-TNA) events

2002

2003

Total Nonstop Action Wrestling (TNA) events

2004

Note – In November 2004, TNA discontinued their weekly pay-per-views and began promoting monthly pay-per-view events.

Monthly pay-per-view events (2004–present)

Total Nonstop Action Wrestling (TNA) events

2004

2005

2006

2007

2008

2009

2010

2011

2012

2013

2014

2015

2016

Impact Wrestling events

2017

2018

2019

2020

2021

2022

2023

One Night Only pay-per-view events (2013–2017)

Total Nonstop Action Wrestling (TNA) events

2013

2014

2015

2016

2017

Impact Wrestling events

2017

Note – In 2018, Impact ceased offering their One Night Only events via pay-per-view providers and the events became exclusive to the Global Wrestling Network.

Number of monthly events by year 

2004 – 2
2005 – 12
2006 – 12
2007 – 12
2008 – 12
2009 – 12
2010 – 12
2011 – 12
2012 – 12
2013 – 4
2014 – 4
2015 – 2
2016 – 2
2017 – 2
2018 – 3
2019 – 6
2020 – 3
2021 - 4
2022 - 5
2023 - 1

Total – 131

See also
List of Impact Wrestling programming
Impact Plus Monthly Specials
Impact One Night Only
List of All Elite Wrestling pay-per-view events
List of ECW supercards and pay-per-view events
List of FMW supercards and pay-per-view events
List of Global Force Wrestling events and specials
List of Major League Wrestling events
List of National Wrestling Alliance pay-per-view events
List of NJPW pay-per-view events
List of NWA pay-per-view events
List of Ring of Honor pay-per-view events
List of Smokey Mountain Wrestling supercard events
List of WWA pay-per-view events
 List of WCW closed-circuit events and ppv events
List of WCW Clash of the Champions shows
List of World Class Championship Wrestling Supercard events
List of WWE pay-per-view and WWE Network events
List of WWE Saturday Night Main Event shows
List of WWE Tribute to the Troops shows

References

External links
 

Professional wrestling-related lists
Impact Wrestling